Aulacodes scaralis is a moth in the family Crambidae. It was described by Schaus in 1906. It is found in Brazil.

References

Acentropinae
Moths described in 1906
Moths of South America